LC-10  may refer to:

 Croses LC-10 Criquet, a 1960s French two-seat homebuilt aircraft
 Launch Complex 10 (disambiguation), two American launch pads
 Suzuki LC10 engine, a 356 cc air-cooled engine